NNI News or News Network International (NNI) is a private-operated national news agency of Pakistan. It is a Pakistan's most prominent news agency after Associated Press of Pakistan (APP) and competitor of INP, ANN, Online, INN, PPA and SABAH. It was established in 1992 and headquartered in G-7 zero point, Islamabad. It also has offices in other major cities of Pakistan including Lahore, Karachi, Quetta and Peshawar. It provides services in both languages Urdu and English. In 2013, an NNI photographer killed in a blast.

References

News agencies based in Pakistan
State media